Peter J. Baxandall (August 11, 1921, Kingston upon Thames, Surrey – September 8, 1995, Malvern, Worcestershire) was an English audio engineer and electronics engineer and a pioneer of the use of analog electronics in audio. He is probably best known for what is now called the Baxandall tone control circuit, first published in a paper in Wireless World.

Biography
Baxandall attended King's College School in London, then got his BSc in electrical engineering at Cardiff Technical College (1942). He was a radio instructor for the Fleet Air Arm for two years, and then worked for the Telecommunications Research Establishment (at the Circuit Research Division headed by Frederic Calland Williams), later renamed and merged to form the Royal Signals and Radar Establishment, until his retirement in 1971. After retiring he worked as a consultant on various audio projects including loudspeakers, tape duplication, and microphone calibration. During this time he continued to publish, including a "seminal chapter" on electrostatic loudspeakers. The Audio Engineering Society made him a Fellow in 1980, and in 1993 awarded him with a Silver Medal for his contributions to the field.

Baxandall tone control circuit
Baxandall's bass and treble control circuit, when made public in Wireless World (1952), "swept all others before it". An early version of the design had already won him an award in 1950 (a $25 watch) at the British Sound Recording Association, a predecessor of the Audio Engineering Society. The design is now employed in millions of hi-fi systems (Baxandall received no royalties for his work).

It exists in several versions—Baxandall's original had two capacitors per potentiometer, but it is possible to use only one at either the treble or bass potentiometers, or both.

References

External links
Baxandall, "Negative Feedback Tone Control" (article from Wireless World, October 1952]

English audio engineers
1921 births
1995 deaths
Signal processing filter
Tone, EQ and filter